Beech Creek is an unincorporated community in Grant County, Oregon. It is located at the intersection of U.S. Route 395 and County Road 27.

History
The name of Beech Creek originates from the stream of the same name; itself named for an early settler in the area. According to Oregon Geographic Names, "it seemed appropriate to name it after Beech Creek because it was near the headwaters of that stream." The post office was established on January 26, 1900, and James T. Berry was the first postmaster. The post office closed in 1955.

References

Unincorporated communities in Grant County, Oregon
Unincorporated communities in Oregon
1900 establishments in Oregon
Populated places established in 1900
1955 disestablishments in Oregon